Dokolo District is a district in the Northern Region of Uganda. The town of Dokolo is its main municipal, administrative, and commercial centre.

Location
Dokolo District is bordered by Lira District to the northwest, Alebtong District to the northeast, Kaberamaido District to the east and south, Amolatar District to the southwest, and Apac District to the west. The coordinates of the district are 01 55N, 33 10E.

Overview
Dokolo District was established by the Ugandan parliament in 2005. It became operational on 1 July 2006. Before that, Dokolo was a county in Lira District. It is part of the larger Lango sub-region, home to an estimated 2.13 million Langi people according to the 2014 national census. The district is a predominantly rural district.

Population
In 1991, the national population census estimated the population of the district at 85,000. The 2002 national census estimated the population at 129,400. The district population grew at a calculated rate of 3.6 percent between 2002 and 2012. It has been estimated that the population of the district in 2012 was 183,400.

See also
 Districts of Uganda

References

External links
Dokolo District Wins Best Water Project Award
Dokolo District: Linking the North to Eastern Uganda

 
Lango sub-region
Districts of Uganda
Northern Region, Uganda
Lake Kyoga